The Marcella Church & School is a historic multifunction building on Arkansas Highway 14 in Marcella, Arkansas.  It is a single-story wood-frame structure, with a gable roof, weatherboard siding, and a small belfry.  The side elevations each have five windows, and the front's only significant feature is the double-door entrance.  Built about 1900, it is a typical and well-preserved example of a building used both as a local schoolhouse and as a church.

The building was listed on the National Register of Historic Places in 1985.

See also
National Register of Historic Places listings in Stone County, Arkansas

References

Churches in Arkansas
Schools in Stone County, Arkansas
Churches on the National Register of Historic Places in Arkansas
Churches completed in 1900
Churches in Stone County, Arkansas
National Register of Historic Places in Stone County, Arkansas
School buildings completed in 1900
1900 establishments in Arkansas